Chlorocystidaceae is a family of green algae. It is the only family in the order Chlorocystidales. The family was formerly placed in the order Ulotrichales.

References

External links

Ulvophyceae
Ulvophyceae families